{{DISPLAYTITLE:C3H7Cl}}
The molecular formula C3H7Cl (molar mass: 78.54 g/mol, exact mass: 78.0236 u) may refer to:

 Isopropyl chloride
 n-Propyl chloride, also known as 1-propyl chloride or 1-chloropropane